Evan Roderic Bowen QC (6 August 1913 – 18 July 2001) was a Welsh lawyer and Liberal Party politician.

Bowen was educated at Cardigan County School, University College, Aberystwyth, St John's College, Cambridge, Brussels and the Inns of Court. He served in the Army for five years during World War II, reaching the rank of captain. He was a barrister and became a Queen's Counsel (QC) in 1952.

At the 1945 general election, Bowen was elected at the first attempt as Member of Parliament for Cardiganshire, succeeding Owen Evans. With only a Labour opponent he comfortably held the seat. He was re-elected in the 1950 general election with the largest Liberal majority at that election, despite facing both Conservative and Labour opposition. During most of the 1950s he was one of a tiny group of only five or six Liberal MPs left at Westminster. He failed to succeed Clement Davies as leader of the Liberal Party in 1956 when Jo Grimond was chosen. Politically, he was on the right of the Liberal Party. During the Suez Crisis, he defended the Conservative Government against opposition "carping criticisms". One of the chief opposition critics of the Government over Suez was his own party leader, Jo Grimond.

Safely returned at the 1959 general election, Bowen's seat was regarded as "the most secure Liberal seat in the whole of the United Kingdom". Even so, it was widely believed that Bowen saw his political career as secondary to his work as a lawyer, a belief that was strengthened by his appointment as Recorder of Cardiff in 1950 and Recorder of Merthyr Tydfil in 1953. His legal work in south Wales resulted in very infrequent appearances in the constituency and his attendance and voting record at Westminster was sporadic. 

Bowen's political career came second to his judicial career although he was a President of the Welsh Liberal Federation and member of its council. He was Recorder of Merthyr Tydfil and of Carmarthen. After the 1964 election when Labour's majority in the House of Commons was just four seats, he was persuaded by the Government to accept the position of Deputy Speaker. This put the Labour majority in the House up to five.

His seat remained safe until the 1964 election when a Conservative candidate intervened and Labour cut his majority to around 2,000. At the 1966 general election, he was defeated by the Labour candidate by just 523 votes.

He served as National Insurance Commissioner for Wales, 1967–86, and as president of St Davids University College, Lampeter, 1977–92. One of the libraries and a research centre at Lampeter carry his name and Roderick Bowen is also the name of one of the student halls of residence. In 1971-72 he chaired a governmental committee set up to examine road signs policy in Wales.

References

Sources

"Grimond's rival: the life and political career of the Liberal MP for Cardiganshire from 1945-1966, Captain E. Roderic Bowen MP (1913–2001)" by J Graham Jones, Journal of Liberal History, Issue 34/35, Spring/Summer 2002

External links

1913 births
2001 deaths
Liberal Party (UK) MPs for Welsh constituencies
Alumni of St John's College, Cambridge
UK MPs 1945–1950
UK MPs 1950–1951
UK MPs 1951–1955
UK MPs 1955–1959
UK MPs 1959–1964
UK MPs 1964–1966
Alumni of Aberystwyth University
Alumni of the Inns of Court School of Law
Members of the Parliament of the United Kingdom for Ceredigion
Welsh barristers
20th-century King's Counsel